Patna Medical College and Hospital (abbreviated as PMCH) was established in 1925 and originally known as Prince of Wales Medical College, is a medical college located in Patna, the state capital of Bihar, India.

It is located on the southern bank of the river Ganges and is now affiliated with Aryabhatta Knowledge University (previously: Patna University). The exact location is on Ashok Rajpath which is also home to other colleges of Patna University. It has more than 1748 beds which is at par with AIIMS. The emergency ward is called IGCE (Indira Gandhi Central Emergency) and has an additional 220 beds. It is one of the busiest hospitals in India. The average daily outpatient load is one of the highest in India.

Campus
Patna Medical College is situated in Ashok Rajpath. The nearest airport is the Patna Airport which is around 10–11 km from the campus. The nearest railway station is the Patna Junction around 5 km from the campus. Mithapur Bus Stand is 9–10 km from the campus.

Upgradation
PMCH is currently being upgraded to be a 5462-bed hospital. This was one of the 37 proposals approved by the cabinet of Government of Bihar in November 2018. The new PMCH premises will be spread over 72.44 lakh square foot area. The new PMCH will have 250 MBBS seats (against the existing 150 MBBS seats), and 200 PG seats (against the existing 146 PG seats). The Rs 5,540- crore project will be executed by the Bihar Medical Infrastructure Structure Corporation Limited. The new hospital will be linked with the under-construction double-decker flyover along Ashok Rajpath and Loknayak Ganga Path (Ganga Expressway). The new building will be constructed employing the Seismic base isolation technique that would protect it from earthquakes, equipped with a helipad on its top.

PMCH Metro station
PMCH will soon get Metro connectivity as the upcoming PMCH metro station under Patna Metro Rail Project (PMRP) will pass beneath the hospital premises. PMCH station will be  part of the 14.45km long Patna Railway Station - Patliputra ISBT Corridor (Corridor-2) of the Patna Metro. PMCH metro station will have 4 entry and exit gates, two inside the PMCH campus and the other two towards the opposite side of road on the Ashok Rajpath. A small subway of 30 metre will also be constructed to provide connectivity towards the entry/exit gate on either side. PMCH metro Station having a length of 225 m, is coming partially inside the campus of PMCH and partially inside the campus of Anjuman Islamia Hall.

In July 2022, the main gate of Patna Medical College and Hospital (PMCH) on Ashok Rajpath was shut to undertake construction work for metro corridor-2. An old gate that led to the emergency department building on its western side, which was closed several years ago, has been reopened to facilitate the movement of doctors and other staff, patients, attendants, ambulances and general public.

Notable alumni

 Dukhan Ram (Padma Bhushan)
 B. Mukhopadhyaya (Padma Bhushan)
 Narendra Kumar Pandey (1974 batch) – Padma Shri (2014) – Chairman and Director of Asian Institute of Medical Sciences
 S. N. Arya (Padma Shri)
 C. P. Thakur (former Union Minister)
 Gopal Prasad Sinha
 Sanjay Jaiswal
 Sunil Shroff
 Vijay Prakash Singh (1972 batch)- Padma Shri (2003)

See also
Nalanda Medical College Hospital
AIIMS Patna
 Indra Gandhi Institute 
of Medical Science
 Mahavir Cancer Sansthan
Maharshi Vashishtha Autonomous State Medical College Basti

Notable faculty 
Gaya Prasad - Former Lecturer, Professor and Principal of P.M.C.H.

References

External links
PMCH official website

Education in Patna
Medical colleges in Bihar
Hospitals in Patna
Hospitals in Bihar
Colleges affiliated to Aryabhatta Knowledge University
1925 establishments in India
Educational institutions established in 1925